Hatten may refer to the following people
Given name
Hatten Baratli (born 1991), Tunisian footballer 
Hatten Yoder (1921–2003), American geophysicist and experimental petrologist

Surname
Joe Hatten (1916–1988), American Major League Baseball pitcher
Kåre Hatten (1908–1983), Norwegian cross-country skier
Marcus Hatten (born 1980), American basketball player
Shay Hatten, American screenwriter
Tom Hatten (1927–2019), American radio, film and television personality